Nora Springs–Rock Falls Community School District was a school district headquartered in Nora Springs, Iowa, United States, serving that city and Rock Falls. It operated a single school serving all grades.

In 2007 it enacted a whole grade sharing program with the North Central Community School District. The NS-RF school board voted unanimously to accept the proposal on June 19, 2006, and the two districts formally signed the grade sharing agreement on July 20, 2006. Nora Springs began hosting a combined middle school while Manly began hosting a combined high school. The superintendent of North Central, Bruce Burton, used the North Butler schools' (of Greene CSD and Allison–Bristow CSD, now North Butler CSD) 28E agreement as a model for consolidation during the merger discussions. Teachers largely supported the consolidation as it meant students would have a larger variety of classes and the teachers would have fewer subjects to prepare for.

The vote to merge the districts, held on September 14, 2010, was successful, with North Central voters doing so on a 431–63 (85.35%) basis and Nora Springs–Rock Falls voters doing so on a 437–262 (59.95%) basis. On July 1, 2011, it merged with the NC district to make the Central Springs Community School District.

References

External links
 

2011 disestablishments in Iowa
School districts disestablished in 2011
Defunct school districts in Iowa
Education in Cerro Gordo County, Iowa
Education in Floyd County, Iowa